Van der Kolk is a Dutch toponymic surname, meaning "from/of the kolk". The surname Van der Wiel has a same origin. It could also have referred to a specific settlement or water named .  People with the surname include:

Bessel van der Kolk (born 1943), Dutch psychiatrist
Henk Van der Kolk, Canadian film producer
Jacobus Schroeder van der Kolk (1797–1862), Dutch physician
Kirsten van der Kolk (born 1975), Dutch rower
Marie José van der Kolk (born 1974), Dutch singer known as Loona
Nick van der Kolk, American podcaster and actor
Niels van der Kolk (born 1970), Dutch water-polo player

See also
Kolk (disambiguation)

References

Dutch-language surnames
Dutch toponymic surnames